Joanna Taylor (born 24 July 1978) is an English actress and former model.

Early life and career
Born in Tooting, South London, Taylor was a student at the Guildford School of Acting. Her big break came in 1999, when she won the role of Geri Hudson in Channel 4 teen soap Hollyoaks. She left in 2001, and has since starred in BBC One police drama, Merseybeat as PC Jackie Brown. In 2004, Taylor appeared in the American film Post Impact with Dean Cain. In 2005, Taylor turned to writing, contributing a weekly column to The Times from the perspective of a "footballer's wife" and in 2007, after taking an extended break from acting, she featured in the British independent film Back in Business, opposite Martin Kemp.

Personal life
Taylor married English international footballer Danny Murphy in 2004. They have two children. The couple separated in 2017.

Filmography
 Hollyoaks (1999–2001) — Geri Hudson
 Hollyoaks: Indecent Behaviour (2000) — Geri Hudson
 Merseybeat (2002–2004) — PC Jackie Brown
 Post Impact (2004) — Sarah Henley
 Back in Business (2007) — Fiona

References

External links

1978 births
Living people
People from Tooting
People educated at Wallington High School for Girls
Alumni of the Guildford School of Acting
English soap opera actresses
English television actresses
Association footballers' wives and girlfriends